The 2017–18 Appalachian State Mountaineers women's basketball team represented Appalachian State University in the 2017–18 NCAA Division I women's basketball season. The Eagles, led by fourth year head coach Angel Elderkin, played their home games at George M. Holmes Convocation Center and were members of the Sun Belt Conference. They finished the season 8–23, 5–13 in Sun Belt play to finish in ninth place. They advanced to the quarterfinals of the Sun Belt women's tournament where they lost to Little Rock.

Previous season
They finished the season 13–19, 6–12 in Sun Belt play to finish in ninth place. They advanced to the quarterfinals of the Sun Belt women's tournament where they lost to Little Rock.

Roster

Schedule

|-
!colspan=9 style=| Exhibition

|-
!colspan=9 style=| Non-conference regular season

|-
!colspan=9 style=| Sun Belt regular season

|-
!colspan=9 style=| Sun Belt Women's Tournament

See also
2017–18 Appalachian State Mountaineers men's basketball team

References

Appalachian State
Appalachian State Mountaineers women's basketball seasons
Appalachian
Appalachian